Anthony Mondell (born Anthony Mondelli, May 18, 1916 – May 15, 2009) was nominated for an Academy Award in the category Best Art Direction for the film Terms of Endearment.

Selected filmography
 Cinderella (1965)
 The Night of the Grizzly (1966)
 Cancel My Reservation (1972)
 The Other Side of Midnight (1977)
 The Last Waltz (1978)
 Rescue from Gilligan's Island (TV) (1978)
 Terms of Endearment (1983)

References

External links

1916 births
2009 deaths
American set decorators